Baron Tuchet was a title that was twice been created in the Peerage of England.

Baron Tuchet; First creation (1299)
 William Tuchet, 1st Baron Tuchet (d. 1322), title extinct.

Baron Tuchet; Second creation (1403)
 John Tuchet, 4th Baron Audley, 1st Baron Tuchet (1371–1408)
 James Tuchet, 5th Baron Audley, 2nd Baron Tuchet (c. 1398-1459)
 For further barons, see Baron Audley

References
G.E. Cokayne; with Vicary Gibbs, H.A. Doubleday, Geoffrey H. White, Duncan Warrand and Lord Howard de Walden, editors, The Complete Peerage of England, Scotland, Ireland, Great Britain and the United Kingdom, Extant, Extinct or Dormant, new ed., 13 volumes in 14 (1910-1959; reprint in 6 volumes, Gloucester, U.K.: Alan Sutton Publishing, 2000), volume I, page 341

1299 establishments in England
Extinct baronies in the Peerage of England
Abeyant baronies in the Peerage of England
Noble titles created in 1299
Noble titles created in 1403